It was the first edition of the tournament.
 Natalie Grandin and Vladimíra Uhlířová won in the final against Raquel Kops-Jones and Abigail Spears 6–4, 6–2.

Seeds

Draw

Draw

References
 Main Draw

The Bahamas Women's Open - Doubles